Hartsville Post Office, also known as the Hartsville Memorial Library and Hartsville Museum, is a historic post office building located at Hartsville, Darlington County, South Carolina.  It was built in 1930, and by the Office of the Supervising Architect, United States Department of the Treasury under James A. Wetmore. Ernest C. Steward, a Treasury department engineer, supervised on-site during the construction. It is a one-story, five bay, brick Colonial Revival style building.  It has a rectangular plan and flat roof with parapet. The symmetrical façade features large arched window openings with decorative keystones. This building served as Hartsville's post office until 1963, when a new post office was built.

It was listed on the National Register of Historic Places in 1997.

The building is now home to the Hartsville Museum, which offers local history and art exhibits.

References

External links
 Hartsville Museum

Post office buildings on the National Register of Historic Places in South Carolina
Colonial Revival architecture in South Carolina
Government buildings completed in 1930
Buildings and structures in Hartsville, South Carolina
National Register of Historic Places in Darlington County, South Carolina
Museums in Darlington County, South Carolina